Memnonia is a genus of leafhoppers belonging to the family Cicadellidae.

The species of this genus are found in Northern America.

Species:
 Memnonia albolinea Ball, 1937 
 Memnonia anthalopus Hamilton, 2000

References

Cicadellidae
Cicadellidae genera